Museum of Modern Art—Port Said is a modern and contemporary art museum, located in Shohada Square, in Port Said, Egypt.

The town of Port Said has an international history of being a cultural crossroads and cosmopolitan community, located at the confluence of the Suez Canal and Mediterranean Sea, on the easternmost edge of the Nile Delta region.

Collection
The Museum of Modern Art in Port Said opened in 1995 and displays a collection of contemporary paintings, graphics, drawings, and ceramics created by Egyptian artists.

See also
Index: Egyptian artists
Note
The similarly named but separate modern art institution, the 'Egyptian Modern Art Museum' or 'Gezira Center for Modern Art,' is located at the National Cultural Centre near the Cairo Opera House, on Gezira Island in central Cairo.

References

Art museums and galleries in Egypt
Modern art museums
Museum of Modern Art in Egypt
Art museums established in 1995
Museum of Modern Art in Egypt